Makalkku is a 2005 Indian Malayalam-language film by Jayaraj, and starring Suresh Gopi and Shobana in lead roles.

Noted Indian singer Adnan Sami performed a song in this movie. Shobana's performance as an intellectually disabled woman won critical acclaim.

Plot
A woman gives birth to a daughter on the streets, her identity is unknown, and she is non-responsive. Her daughter, Manasi, is raised in the mental asylum, and looked after with love by the staff of the mental asylum. Manasi's intrusion into the lives of these patients becomes a rain to those dry lives. They eagerly take care of the child with the assistance of other hospital staff. A girl named Bindu, who was falsely accused of being mad, takes into deeply caring for Manasi. Her enchanting lullaby flows around the whole asylum like a settling relief. Few days later, Bindu is asked to leave the asylum on grounds of being totally sane. But she prefers her home at the asylum with her friends saying that the world outside is totally strange for her. Dr. Warrier is helpless. So she bids farewell to her dear Manasi and the others at the asylum. Her departure marks a point of deep aching grief to everyone at the hospital. The next day, it is revealed in the newspaper that Bindu had committed suicide. Thereafter, Manasi grows older winning the hearts of everyone at the hospital. Shortly, a notice from Human Rights Commission arrives, asking the authorities to let go of Manasi's care.

Cast
Shobana as Killeri 
Suresh Gopi as Dr. Warrier 
Raihana as Manasi (as Baby Raihana)
Shalu Menon as Bindu
Valsala Menon as Gayathri
Vinayakan as Mental Patient
Nilambur Ayisha as Mental Patient
 Ranjith Velayudhan
Manka Mahesh as Nurse
Kozhikode Sharada as Nurse
Poornima Anand as Nurse Sumathi
Ramakrishnan as Nambeeshan

Soundtrack
The film's soundtrack contains 8 songs, all composed by Ramesh Narayan. Lyrics by Kaithapram Damodaran Namboothiri, Rifat Sulthan and Anil Panachooran.

Awards
Kerala State Film Award for Best Singer in 2004 for Manjari for the song Mukilin makalae....
Kerala State Film Award for Best Makeup Artist in 2004 for Renjith Ambadi

References

External links
 

2000s Malayalam-language films
2005 drama films
2005 films
Films about intellectual disability
Indian drama films